Bhupal Rai is a poet, lyricist, writer and editor. He has voiced for the rights of the marginalised people through his writings. His writings carry the organic essence of the Kirati people and their culture. His writings carry the blend of Marxist philosophy and socio-cultural pragmatism of the indigenous people.

About his life and career

Poet Bhupal Rai was born in Bastim Village of Bhojpur(also known as  Maajh Kirat), eastern hilly district of Nepal. 

After his high school education, he moved to Kathmandu for higher studies. His literary journey started with publication of his first poem in "Chhahara" monthly magazine around 1977 AD. The magazine was published by his elder brother Gopal Chhanchha. Bhupal became regular columnist in that magazine later with satirical column called "Bela ko boli".

He indulged himself in song writing and music composing in 1980s. He also recorded a number of songs as Radio Nepal Singer during that decade. But after 1990s, he quit singing to focus in writing. He believes that not only in his  poems but also in his songs, he has written about the racial discriminations, class struggles and Kirat culture and values.

He has made euro tour and recently visited Hong Kong in September, 2016 invitation by Critics' Society.

Published Books

He has authored 6 books and compiled and edited numerous books and magazines.

   Sumnima ko Tasvir (1996) anthology of poems
   Dajai kavita gaau mai chha (2000)
   Pahilo Haraf Sirbandi published by Narahang Rai (1999)
    Simanta Soundarya (Astheics of Margin by Kirat Academy (2010)
   Bhumigat Prashna Haru (Latent Questions) published by United Academy (2012)
   Aago le Janmotsav Manaudaina published by Chindo Books (2015)

Awards
 Best Lyricist in Radio Nepal (year 1992)
 1st Runner UP in Nepal Academy national poem competition (1993)
 Best Lyricist NEFEJ Song Competition (1994)
 Curriculum Song Award by Curriculum Development Center (1995)
 Nepali Pratibha Pratisthan Award UK (2015)

References

External links
 Poems in sahityasangraha.com
 Book Print Edition Kantipur daily
 Article by Hangyug Agyat on Bhupal Rai
 PoetShrawan Mukarung's article
 Hatteri.Com
 Youtube Lyricist Bhupal Rai's jukebox 1
 Lyricist Bhupal Rai's jukebox 2
 Lyricist Bhupal Rai's jukebox 3

1960 births
Living people
Nepali-language writers
Nepalese male poets
People from Bhojpur District, Nepal
21st-century Nepalese poets